The Indians cricket team was an Indian first-class cricket team which took part in the annual Madras Presidency Matches against the Europeans cricket team, commencing in December 1915.

References

Sources
 Vasant Raiji, India's Hambledon Men, Tyeby Press, 1986
 Mihir Bose, A History of Indian Cricket, Andre-Deutsch, 1990
 Ramachandra Guha, A Corner of a Foreign Field - An Indian History of a British Sport, Picador, 2001

Indian first-class cricket teams